Röhr (Roehr) is a surname. Notable people with the name include:

 Julius (Philip Benjamin) von Röhr (1737–1793), a Prussian botanist and plant collector, naturalist, medical doctor and watercolourist
 Julius Edward Roehr (1860–?), member of the Wisconsin State Senate 
 (Franz Hermann) Otto Röhr (1891–1972), a German track and field athlete
 Hans Gustav Röhr (1895–1937), a German aviation pioneer and automobile designer
 Julius von Rohr (1737–1793), German-born Danish botanist 
 Matthias "Gonzo" Röhr (born 1962, Frankfurt), rock guitarist
 Peter Roehr (1944–1968), a German painter
 Walter Roehrich, founder of the Roehr Motorcycle Company, a US motorcycle manufacturer

German-language surnames